Beniamino Mateinaqara (born 19 August 1987) is a Fijian footballer who plays as a goalkeeper for Lautoka in the Fijian National Football League.

References

External links

1987 births
Living people
People from Taveuni
Fijian footballers
Association football goalkeepers
Fiji international footballers
Nadi F.C. players
Navua F.C. players
Hekari United players
Suva F.C. players
Lautoka F.C. players
2008 OFC Nations Cup players
2012 OFC Nations Cup players
2016 OFC Nations Cup players